Slavyansk-na-Kubani is an airport in Slavyansk-na-Kubani Krasnodar Krai Russia located on the southern outskirts of the city, 5 km from the center. It is currently used for aerial work. Airfield Slavyansk-na-Kubani, a class project is capable of receiving aircraft: An-12, An-24, An-26, An-72, Il-18, Il-76, Tu-134, Tu-154, Yak-42 and more light, as well as helicopters of all types.

References

External links 
 http://avsim.su/files.phtml%3Fuploader%3D22209%26page%3D2
 http://wikimapia.org/13435623/ru/%25D0%2590%25D1%258D%25D1%2580%25D0%25BE%25D0%25B4%25D1%2580%25D0%25BE%25D0%25BC

Airports in Krasnodar Krai